Shoe Palace Pinkus (German: Schuhpalast Pinkus) is a 1916 German silent comedy film directed by Ernst Lubitsch and starring Lubitsch, Else Kentner and Guido Herzfeld. In English it is sometimes known by the alternative titles Shoe Salon Pinkus and The Shoe Palace. It was part of the Sally series of films featuring Lubitsch as a sharp young Berliner of Jewish heritage. After leaving school, a self-confident young man goes to work in a shoe shop. Soon after, he becomes a shoe tycoon.

It premièred on 9 June 1916 at the Union-Theater Nollendorfplatz, and at the U.-T. Kurfürstendamm (Filmbühne Wien), Berlin.

Cast
 Ernst Lubitsch as Sally Pinkus
 Else Kentner as Melitta Herve
 Guido Herzfeld as Mr. Meiersohn
 Ossi Oswalda as Apprentice
 Hanns Kräly as Teacher
 Erich Schönfelder as Schuhmacher
 Fritz Rasp

References

Bibliography
 Eyman, Scott. Ernst Lubitsch: Laughter in Paradise. Johns Hopkins University Press, 2000.
 Prawer, S.S. Between Two Worlds: The Jewish Presence in German and Austrian Film, 1910-1933. Berghahn Books, 2005.

External links

1916 films
Films of the German Empire
German silent feature films
1916 comedy films
German comedy films
Films directed by Ernst Lubitsch
Films set in Berlin
German black-and-white films
1916 directorial debut films
Silent comedy films
1910s German films
1910s German-language films